Save Italy is the name of the economic recovery plan Italian Prime Minister Mario Monti. The package of fiscal adjustments is worth €30 billion ($40 billion) over three years,  and includes tax increases, pension cuts, stronger protection against tax evasion, and an increase in the retirement age. The reform package is meant to reduce debt, balance the budget and increase investor confidence.

Monti, a technocrat who replaced Silvio Berlusconi as  Prime Minister, said the plan was necessary to prevent the economy of Italy from becoming like Greece.

References 

Economy of Italy